2nd Street station (signed as 2nd Street–Penn's Landing–Old City on platforms) is a subway station on the Market-Frankford Line, beneath the intersection of 2nd Street and Market Street in Center City Philadelphia, Pennsylvania. It is the easternmost stop in Center City and also the easternmost underground stop on the line.

The station serves the Old City neighborhood of Philadelphia, with station signs originally reading "Olde City". The 'e' has been covered on the signs with obvious blue stickers. The station also serves Penn's Landing and Spruce Street Harbor Park along the Delaware River.

2nd Street is also served by SEPTA bus routes 5, 17, 33, and 48 also serve the station.

History

The station opened August 3, 1908 as part of the first extension of the Philadelphia Rapid Transit Company's Market Street Subway. The line had originally opened a year earlier between 69th Street and City Hall. The station was the eastern terminal of the line until September 7 of that year, when it was extended to the elevated Market–Chestnut station along the Delaware River. It was not until November 5, 1922, when trains were extended northeast along the current route of the Market–Frankford elevated.

On June 22, 2019, a passenger fell onto the tracks and was killed by an oncoming train.

Station layout
The station has two side platforms. East of the station, the tracks turn north and begin to run elevated above Front Street towards Northeast Philadelphia.

References

External links
 

2nd Street-Penn's Landing Station images (World-NYCSubway.org)
2nd Street entrance from Google Maps Street View

SEPTA Market-Frankford Line stations
Railway stations in Philadelphia
Railway stations in the United States opened in 1908
Railway stations located underground in Pennsylvania
1908 establishments in Pennsylvania